Mighty Mouse is an American animated character created by the Terrytoons studio for 20th Century Fox. The character is a anthropomorphic superhero mouse, originally called Super Mouse, and made his debut in the 1942 short The Mouse of Tomorrow. The name was changed to Mighty Mouse in his eighth film, 1944's The Wreck of the Hesperus, and the character went on to star in 80 theatrical shorts, concluding in 1961 with Cat Alarm.

In 1955, Mighty Mouse Playhouse debuted as a Saturday morning cartoon show on the CBS television network, which popularized the character far more than the original theatrical run. The show lasted until 1967. Filmation revived the character in The New Adventures of Mighty Mouse and Heckle & Jeckle, which ran from 1979 to 1980, and animation director Ralph Bakshi revived the concept again in Mighty Mouse: The New Adventures, from 1987 to 1988.

Mighty Mouse also appeared in comic books by several publishers, including his own series, Mighty Mouse and The Adventures of Mighty Mouse, which ran from 1946 to 1968.

Mighty Mouse is known for his theme song, "Mighty Mouse Theme (Here I Come to Save the Day)", written by composer Marshall Barer.

History

Super Mouse
The character originated in 1942 from an idea by animator Isidore Klein at the Terrytoons studio, who suggested a parody/homage to the popular Superman character, making some sketches of a superhero fly. Paul Terry, the head of the studio, liked the idea but suggested a mouse rather than an insect.

The character was dubbed "Super Mouse", and his first theatrical short, The Mouse of Tomorrow, debuted on October 16, 1942.

In his book Of Mice and Magic, critic Leonard Maltin describes the character's origin story:

The trade journal Variety said The Mouse of Tomorrow "just misses being outstanding, mainly because of faulty narration and too much kidding of Superman. Idea of super-rat conquering prowling beasts of feline world is good, but too closely follows pattern of that super hero."

Super Mouse (and his later alias, Mighty Mouse) was originally voiced by Roy Halee Sr., a tenor who often sang on radio and first started doing cartoon voices for J. R. Bray's studio. In the operatic melodramas to follow, Halee and his quartet provided all of the vocals.

In Super Mouse's next film, he spoofed the popular Universal Monsters films (Frankenstein's Cat, 1942). In Pandora's Box (1943), he battled bat-winged cat demons, and his origin story was changed: now he becomes Super Mouse by eating vitamins A through Z. The hero made seven films in 1942–1943 before his name was changed.

Mighty Mouse: rename and redesign
In 1944, Paul Terry learned that another character named "Super Mouse" was to be published in Standard Comics' Coo-Coo Comics, so his character's name was changed to Mighty Mouse. The first short under the character's new name was The Wreck of the Hesperus, released February 11, 1944, adapting the celebrated poem by Henry Wadsworth Longfellow with the addition of a superhero mouse. A couple months later, the studio spoofed another classic, Robert Louis Stevenson's Strange Case of Dr Jekyll and Mr Hyde, under the title Mighty Mouse Meets Jeckyll and Hyde Cat.

By summer, Mighty Mouse's costume got an overhaul as well. Until this point, he'd been wearing Superman's colors—a blue costume with a red cape—but in the June 16, 1944, cartoon Eliza on the Ice, Mighty Mouse appears for the first time in a red costume, with a yellow cape. This is also the first time that the character was portrayed as living among the stars, hurtling down from the heavens to save the day.

The final design of the character debuted in the 15th cartoon, The Sultan's Birthday, released on October 13, 1944. In this cartoon, redesigned by animator Connie Rasinski, Mighty Mouse has a fuller figure with an exaggerated upper body, and is clad in a yellow outfit, with a red cape and trunks.

Like his inspiration, Superman, Mighty Mouse's superpowers are vast and sometimes appear limitless. His main powers include flight, super-strength and invulnerability. The early cartoons often portray him as a ruthless fighter; one of his most frequent tactics is to fly under an enemy's chin and let loose a volley of blows, subduing the opponent through sheer physical punishment.

However, his powers can vary, depending on the demands of the story; he is sometimes knocked unconscious or rendered temporarily immobile by the villain, only to rise again by the end of the cartoon and save the day. In some films, he uses X-ray vision and psychokinesis. He was also able to turn back time in 1946's The Johnstown Flood. Other cartoons, like 1945's Krakatoa, show him leaving a red contrail during flight that he can manipulate like a band of solid, flexible matter. In several of the cartoons, when Mighty Mouse achieves the impossible feats, the narrator exclaims, first in a normal voice: " What A Mouse!!!!!", followed by his louder triumphant voice: "WHAT A MOUSE!!!!!"

In a 1969 interview, Terry said that Mighty Mouse's power had a religious aspect: "When a man is sick, or down, or hurt, you say, 'There's nothing more we can do. It's in God's hand.' And he either survives or he doesn't according to God's plan. Right? So, 'Man's extremity is God's opportunity.' So, taking that as a basis, I'd only have to get the mice in a tough spot and then say, 'Isn't there someone who can help?' 'Yes, there is someone; it's Mighty Mouse!' So, down from the heavens he'd come sailing down and lick the evil spirit, or whatever it was. And everything would be serene again." Biographer W. Gerald Harmonic notes that as of the mid 40s, Mighty Mouse would be pictured living on a star or a cloud, up in the heavens, and that he became "a Christ-like figure, a savior of all 'mouse-kind'."

While his typical opponents are nondescript cats, Mighty Mouse occasionally battles specific villains, though most appear in only one or two films. Several of the earliest "Super Mouse" films (having been made during World War II), feature the cats as thinly veiled caricatures of the Nazis, hunting down mice and marching them into concentration camp–like traps to what would otherwise be their doom. The Bat-cats, alien cats with bat wings and wheels for feet, appeared in two cartoons; in two others between 1949 and 1950 he faces a huge, dim-witted, but super-strong cat named Julius "Pinhead" Schlabotka (voiced by Dayton Allen) whose strength rivals Mighty Mouse's. In rare moments, he confronts non-feline adversaries such as human villain Bad Bill Bunion and his horse, or the Automatic Mouse Trap, a brontosaur-shaped robotic monster. In The Green Line (1944), the cats and the mice live on either side of a green dividing line down the middle of their town's main street. They agree to keep the peace as long as no one crosses it. An evil entity, a Satan cat, starts the cats and mice fighting. At the end, Mighty Mouse is cheered by mice and cats alike.

Melodrama spoofs
In 1945, Mighty Mouse and the Pirates was the first Mighty Mouse cartoon to feature sung dialogue, in the operetta style. Gypsy Life (1945) and The Crackpot King (1946) followed in the same style. Gypsy Life was particularly successful, earning Terry his third nomination for an Academy Award for Short Subjects (Cartoon).

There was a romantic, damsel in distress element in these cartoons—in each one, Mighty Mouse saves a dark-haired beauty from terrible trouble, and in the latter two, the camera fades out on the hero and the girl in a romantic clinch. While these were very similar to the musical melodrama spoofs that were soon to emerge, they didn't have an overwrought narrator, or the suggestion that the cartoon is an episode of a continuing story.

In November 1947, A Fight to the Finish was the first in a series of musical melodrama spoofs, with Mighty Mouse saving damsel in distress Pearl Pureheart (sometimes "Little Nell") from the villainous, mustache-twirling cat Oil Can Harry. Terrytoons revived the concept from their earlier Fanny Zilch series, a melodrama spoof that ran for seven cartoons from 1933 to 1937. Fanny was constantly tormented by a human version of Oil Can Harry, and protected by her lover, J. Leffingwell Strongheart.

A Fight to the Finish begins with a snatch of Cole Porter's song "And The Villain Still Pursued Her", which had also been used as the theme for the Fanny Zilch cartoons. The narrator opens with an urgent recap of the (nonexistent) previous episode: "In our last episode, we left Mighty Mouse at the old Beaver River station. As you remember, folks, he was locked in a desperate struggle with a villain. But on with the story..." Mighty Mouse is engaging in "a fight to the finish" with Oil Can Harry, now a villainous cat with a mustache, a top hat and a big black cloak, voiced by Tom Morrison. The blonde heroine, Pearl Pureheart, is tied up in the other room, but refuses to give up hope. Harry manages to knock out Mighty Mouse, and leaves him tied to the railroad track with a bomb on his head, and the 5:15 train due to pass by. Harry drives Pearl away to his home, where he woos her in song, to no avail. Mighty Mouse manages to blow out the fuse, stop the train and escape from his bonds, and rushes to Pearl's rescue. At Harry's house, they fight with fists, guns and swords, as Pearl slips out the window and onto a passing log which is floating down the river into a mill. Mighty Mouse throws Harry into the river and rushes to rescue Pearl, who's heading for the buzzsaw. The narrator asks, "Is our little heroine doomed to destruction in the sawmill? Will Mighty Mouse arrive in time? See the following episode, next week!" The camera starts to iris out, but then stops, as the narrator relents, "Stop! Gosh, we can't wait until next week. Please, show us what happens, won't you?" Mighty Mouse grabs Pearl in time, and the pair have a brief romantic chorus together as the cartoon delivers a happy ending.

The melodrama spoofs continued as an occasional series over the next six years, with Oil Can Harry and Pearl Pureheart returning in thirteen more cartoons. Another memorable short was 1949's The Perils of Pearl Pureheart, in which Oil Can Harry hypnotizes Pearl into singing "Carry Me Back to Old Virginny" on stage at an old saloon, where he vacuums up the tips thrown by the audience. Hypnotized for three and a half minutes of the six-minute cartoon, Pearl continues to sing as the battle between Harry and Mighty Mouse rages around her, even underwater.

To vary the formula, the melodramas started traveling to exotic locales, including Italy (Sunny Italy, 1951), Switzerland (Swiss Miss, 1951), Holland (Happy Holland, 1952) and even prehistoric times (Prehistoric Perils, 1952) and medieval times (When Mousehood Was in Flower, 1953).

The fourteen Oil Can Harry melodrama theatricals were:

 A Fight to the Finish (1947)
 Loves Labor Won (1948)
 The Mysterious Stranger (1948)
 Triple Trouble (1948)
 A Cold Romance (1949) 
 The Perils of Pearl Pureheart (1949)
 Stop, Look and Listen (1949)
 Beauty on the Beach (1950)
 Sunny Italy (1951)
 Swiss Miss (1951)
 Prehistoric Perils (1952)
 Happy Holland (1952)
 A Soapy Opera (1953)
 When Mousehood Was in Flower (1953)

Television

Mighty Mouse Playhouse

Mighty Mouse had little theatrical impact, but became Terrytoons' most popular character and a cultural icon on television. In 1955, Paul Terry sold the Terrytoons studio to CBS, which repackaged the theatrical cartoons as a popular Saturday morning show, Mighty Mouse Playhouse. The show aired from December 1955 through September 1967, using the existing film library. Only three new cartoons were produced after the sale. The final season also included a new feature, entitled The Mighty Heroes.

Tom Morrison of Terrytoons provided the speaking voice of Mighty Mouse in the show's new framing sequences.

The show's theme song was credited on some early records to "The Terrytooners, Mitch Miller and Orchestra". However, writer Mark Evanier credits a group called The Sandpipers (not the 1960s easy listening group of the same name).

The New Adventures of Mighty Mouse and Heckle & Jeckle

In 1979–1980, Filmation made television cartoons starring Mighty Mouse and fellow Terrytoon characters Heckle and Jeckle in a show called The New Adventures of Mighty Mouse and Heckle & Jeckle. The show introduced two new characters: a vampire duck named Quacula (not to be confused with Count Duckula), and Oil Can Harry's bumbling, large, but swift-running, henchman Swifty. The show premiered in 1979 and lasted two seasons. In the Filmation series and movie, Mighty Mouse and Oil Can Harry were performed by veteran voice artist Alan Oppenheimer, and Pearl Pureheart was voiced by Diane Pershing. Frank Welker played Heckle, Jeckle and Quacula, and Norm Prescott played Theodore H. Bear.

Each episode included two traditional Mighty Mouse cartoons, as well as an episode of a Mighty Mouse science-fiction serial, "The Great Space Chase". The hour was rounded out with two Heckle & Jeckle cartoons and one Quacula cartoon, plus short bumpers with tips about safety and the environment. The total cartoons produced for the series were 32 Mighty Mouse cartoons, 32 Heckle & Jeckle cartoons, 16 episodes of "The Great Space Chase" and 16 Quacula cartoons.

The "Space Chase" episodes were edited together into a theatrical matinee movie, Mighty Mouse in the Great Space Chase, which was released on December 10, 1982.

Mighty Mouse: The New Adventures
In 1987 and 1988, animation producer Ralph Bakshi (who began his career at Terrytoons in the late 1950s and worked on the last Mighty Mouse shorts filmed by that company) created a new series of Mighty Mouse cartoons entitled Mighty Mouse: The New Adventures for the CBS Saturday morning children's lineup. In this series, Mighty Mouse has a real identity, Mike Mouse (both identities voiced by Patrick Pinney), and a sidekick, Scrappy Mouse (voiced by actress Dana Hill), the little orphan. Though a children's cartoon, its heavy satirical tone, risqué humor and adult jokes made the Bakshi Mighty Mouse series a collector's item for collectors of older television series.

The best-remembered episode of this series featured a crossover with Mighty Mouse and another Bakshi creation, the Mighty Heroes (Strong Man, Tornado Man, Rope Man, Cuckoo Man and Diaper Man). In the 1988 episode "Heroes and Zeroes", the Mighty Heroes were middle-aged men (except for Diaper Man, who was 36) and were all accountants with the firm of Man, Man, Man, Man, and Man.

Later years
Marvel Comics produced a 10-issue comic book series (set in the New Adventures continuity) in 1990 and 1991. Nothing new has been produced using the Mighty Mouse character except for an arcade game by Atari and a 2001 "The power of cheese" television commercial. That commercial shows Mighty Mouse dining calmly on cheese in a restaurant, utterly unconcerned with a scene of chaos and terror visibly unfolding in the street outside. The commercial was hastily withdrawn in the wake of the September 11, 2001, attacks.

The character appeared in the 1999 pilot Curbside.

Until 2019, the rights to Mighty Mouse were divided as a result of the 2006 corporate split of Viacom (the former owner of the Terrytoons franchise) into two separate companies. CBS Operations (a unit of the CBS Corporation) owns the ancillary rights and trademarks to the character, while Paramount Home Entertainment/CBS Home Entertainment holds home video rights. The first official release of Mighty Mouse material has been announced and what is now CBS Media Ventures has television syndication rights (the shorts are currently out of circulation). On December 4, 2019, CBS Corporation and Viacom re-merged into a single entity, ViacomCBS (now Paramount Global), officially reuniting the rights to Mighty Mouse under the same company.

Feature film adaptation
As early as 2004, Paramount Pictures and Nickelodeon Movies announced their intention to bring Mighty Mouse back to the motion picture screen with a CGI Mighty Mouse feature film that was tentatively scheduled to be released some time in 2013.

In April 2019, Jon and Erich Hoeber signed on to script the film for Paramount Animation while Karen Rosenfelt (Wonder Park) and Robert Cort (Terminator Genisys) are set to produce. The film will be in live action/animated.

Terrytoons theatrical shorts
The first seven films starred the character named Super Mouse. In these early films the character's costume is much closer in design to that of Superman (blue tunic and tights with red trunks and cape).

 

In the eighth cartoon, the character's name was changed to Mighty Mouse.

Comics
Mighty Mouse's first comic book appearance was in Terry-Toons Comics #38 (November 1945), published by Timely Comics. Mighty Mouse was featured in:

 Terry-Toons Comics #38–85 (1945–1951)
 Paul Terry's Comics #86–125 (1951–1955)

Mighty Mouse was also featured in two main titles by several different publishers: Mighty Mouse and The Adventures of Mighty Mouse.

Mighty Mouse, Timely Comics #1–4 (1946)
Mighty Mouse Comics, St. John Publications #5–21 (1947–1949)
Paul Terry's Mighty Mouse Comics, St. John Publications #22–67 (1949–1955)
Paul Terry's Mighty Mouse, Pines Comics #68–83 (1956–1959)
Paul Terry's Mighty Mouse Adventures, St. John Publications #1 (1951)
Adventures of Mighty Mouse, St. John Publications #2–18 (1952–1955)
The Adventures of Mighty Mouse (renaming of Paul Terry's Comics, where Mighty Mouse appeared)
St. John Publications #126–128 (1955); as Paul Terry's Adventures of Mighty Mouse
Pines Comics #129–144 (1956–1959)
Dell Comics #144–155 (1959–1961) NOTE: Dell's series also started with an issue numbered 144
Gold Key Comics #156–160 (1962–1963)
Dell Comics #161–172 (1964–1968)

Mighty Mouse, Spotlight Comics, #1–2 (1987)
Mighty Mouse, Marvel Comics, #1–10 (1990), based on the Ralph Bakshi version (Mighty Mouse: The New Adventures)
Mighty Mouse, Dynamite Entertainment, #1–5 (2017–2018, collected as Volume 1: Saving the Day)

In 1953, Mighty Mouse was featured in Three Dimension Comics #1, the first three-dimensional comics publication, produced by St. John Publications. According to co-creator Joe Kubert, the 3-D issue sold an extraordinary 1.2 million copies at 25 cents each, more than twice the standard comic price of 10 cents.

DVD releases
Mighty Mouse: The New Adventures, the first official release of Mighty Mouse material, was released on January 5, 2010.

At least one episode, Wolf! Wolf!, has fallen into the public domain and is available at the Internet Archive.

Video games

 In October 2008,  a series of two pachinko games was released in Japan by Fuji Shogi.
 On February 22, 2012, a video game titled MIGHTY MOUSE My Hero was released for iOS, as well as an exclusive version for the iPad titled MIGHTY MOUSE My Hero HD.
 In the first quarter of 2019, Worldwide Video Entertainment Inc. started to sell the Mighty Mouse Mini Claw Machine.

Controversy

In 1988, Mighty Mouse: The New Adventures was the subject of media controversy when one scene was interpreted as a depiction of cocaine use. In the episode "The Littlest Tramp" a poor mouse girl attempts to sell flowers, and is repeatedly harassed by a rich man who crushes her flowers. She runs out of flowers and makes new ones from sundry items she finds, such as tomato slices, but the man crushes these too. Mighty Mouse attempts to purchase the flowers with his chunk of cheese, and to avenge the girl, but she gives Mighty Mouse the crushed flowers and insists that others need help more than she does. After successfully saving several different characters, he is reminded of the girl, and attempts to smell the flowers she gave him (now a pink powder), inhaling them in the process. He then finds the man that has been harassing the girl, and spanks him. The girl is sympathetic to the man, and he is so moved that the two are married.

A family in Kentucky saw the episode and reportedly interpreted the scene as Mighty Mouse snorting cocaine. The family called the American Family Association in Tupelo, Mississippi. The group demanded Bakshi be removed from production of the series. Bakshi and CBS denied the allegations, Bakshi stating the whole incident "smacks of McCarthyism. I'm not going to get into who sniffs what. This is lunacy." To defuse the controversy, Bakshi agreed to cut the 3.5 seconds from the episode. Rev. Donald Wildmon claimed that the editing was a "de facto admission" of cocaine use, though Bakshi maintained that the episode was "totally innocent".

Cultural influences
 
In the book Astro Boy Essays, author Frederik L. Schodt quotes Japanese animator Osamu Tezuka as saying that Mighty Mouse was the influence that inspired him to name his well-known character Mighty Atom (also known as Astro Boy). He also chose to imitate Mighty Mouse's signature flying pose with one arm stretched ahead with a clenched fist.

Mighty Mouse was planned to make a cameo in the deleted scene "Acme's Funeral" from the 1988 film Who Framed Roger Rabbit.

Mighty Mouse was featured on famed guitarist Tom Scholz's Les Paul guitar.

The song "Astro Man" by Jimi Hendrix, a part of the Black Gold session, includes a version of the 'Here I come to save the day!' fanfare.

A clip of the episode "Wolf! Wolf!" was featured in Serj Tankian's music video "Harakiri".

As part of Andy Kaufman's act, he would play the Mighty Mouse theme while standing perfectly still and lip-sync only the line "Here I come to save the day" with great enthusiasm; a 1975 performance of this act on Saturday Night Live is recreated in the 1999 biopic Man on the Moon.

Mighty Mouse was on the uniform of NASCAR driver Alan Kulwicki and on the front end of his #7 Hooters "Underbird" during the final race at the Atlanta Motor Speedway's 1992 Hooters 500.

Apple trademark dispute

On August 2, 2005, Apple released the company's first multi-control USB computer mouse. The product was designed by Mitsumi Electric and premiered under the name Apple Mighty Mouse. Apple continued to use the name when the product was redesigned as a Bluetooth device in 2006. Prior to its release, CBS licensed the right to use the Mighty Mouse name to Apple. In 2008, Man and Machine, Inc., a company that produces medical grade, chemical-resistant, mice and keyboards, sued both Apple and CBS for trademark infringement. Man and Machine claimed that it had used the name since 2004 and that CBS did not have the right to license the name for computer peripherals. In 2009, the U.S. Patent and Trademark Office ruled in favor of Man and Machine and Apple changed the name of its product to the "Apple Mouse".

See also

Dinkan, a Malayalam comic superhero mouse

References

Further reading
The Animated Movie Guide by Jerry Beck, Chicago Review Press, October 2005, 
Unfiltered: The Complete Ralph Bakshi, Universe, April 2008, 

Castle Films: a hobbyists's guide by Scott MacGillivray, iUniverse, Inc., 
The Encyclopedia of Cartoon Superstars: From A to (Almost Z), by John Cawley and Jim Korkis, Pioneer Books, November 1990, 
 Who's Who in Animated Cartoons, by Jeff Lenburg, Applause Books, June 1, 2006, 
Modern Masters Volume 3: Bruce Timm, by Eric Nolen-Weathington & Bruce Timm, TwoMorrows Publishing, June 1, 2004, 
Truth and Rumors: The Reality Behind TV's Most Famous Myths, by Bill Brioux, Praeger, December 30, 2007, 
American Animated Cartoons of the Vietnam Era: A Study of Social Commentary in Films And Television Programs, 1961–1973, Christopher P. Lehman, McFarland & Company, October 27, 2006,

External links

 
 Mighty Mouse at TVShowsOnDVD.com
 Terrytoons – The TV Series via the Wayback Machine at Toontracker

American comics characters
American film series
Animal superheroes
Animated film series
Anthropomorphic mice and rats
Comics about animals
Comics about mice and rats
Comics characters with superhuman strength
Dell Comics titles
Fictional anthropomorphic characters
Film characters introduced in 1942
Fictional characters with superhuman strength
Fictional mice and rats
Film series introduced in 1942
Gold Key Comics titles
Marvel Comics titles
Parody superheroes
Television series by CBS Studios
Terrytoons characters
Films adapted into comics
Male characters in animation
Male characters in comics
Comics characters introduced in 1942
Science fiction film series